Mzuzu Airport  is an airport serving Mzuzu, the capital city of the Northern Region of the Republic of Malawi.

Facilities 

References

External links
 
 

Airports in Malawi
Mzuzu
Buildings and structures in Northern Region, Malawi